The Office of the President assists the President of South Korea. Chief of Staff to the President is the head of the Office of the President and is a ministerial-level official. Cheong Wa Dae or Blue House was often used as a metonym for the Presidential Secretariat because of its location before President Yoon Suk-yeol moved the office and residency of the President out of Blue House in May 2022. The Presidential Secretariat is an important part of the executive branch of the South Korean government.

Members

Yoon Suk-yeol Administration 
President Yoon almost halved the size of his secretariat following his campaign promise to give more authority to ministers. Chief Presidential Secretary for Policy as well as advisors to the presidents have been abolished.

Senior Presidential Secretary for Political Affairs (정무수석비서관)

Senior Presidential Secretary for Civil Society (시민사회수석비서관)

Senior Presidential Secretary for Public Relations (홍보수석비서관)

Senior Presidential Secretary for Economic Affairs (경제수석비서관)

Senior Presidential Secretary for Social Affairs (사회수석비서관)

Moon Jae-in Administration
Under the Moon Jae-in administration, the Presidential Secretariat is made up of the Chief Presidential Secretary, Chief Presidential Secretary for Policy, two Advisors to the President and eight senior presidential secretaries as well as over 400 other public servants. There are also four unpaid Special Advisors to the President.

The Chief Presidential Secretary is accompanied by the first five senior presidential secretaries listed below whereas Chief Presidential Secretary for Policy is accompanied by the remaining three.

Senior Presidential Secretary for Political Affairs (정무수석비서관)

Senior Presidential Secretary for Civil Affairs (민정수석비서관)

Senior Presidential Secretary for Civil Society (시민사회수석비서관)
previously Senior Presidential Secretary for Social Innovation (사회혁신수석비서관)

Senior Presidential Secretary for Public Affairs (국민소통수석비서관)

Senior Presidential Secretary for Personnel Management (인사수석비서관)

Senior Presidential Secretary for Job Creation (일자리수석비서관)

Senior Presidential Secretary for Economic Affairs (경제수석비서관)

Senior Presidential Secretary for Social Affairs (사회수석비서관)

Advisor to the President for Science and Technology (과학기술보좌관)

Advisor to the President for Economic Affairs (경제보좌관)

Special Advisors to the President (특별보좌관)

Special Presidential Envoy (특별사절)

See also
Chief of Staff to the President (South Korea)
Chief Presidential Secretary for Policy
Senior Presidential Secretary
President of South Korea

References

Government of South Korea
Presidencies of South Korea